Clarksville-Montgomery County School System (CMCSS) is a system of schools in Montgomery County, Tennessee serving a population of over 152,934 people.  It is the seventh largest district in Tennessee and has earned whole district accreditation. CMCSS is also ISO 9001 certified. Jean Luna-Vedder is currently the Director of Schools. 

The system serves most of the county. However portions in Fort Campbell are zoned to Department of Defense Education Activity (DoDEA) schools.

The school system has a graduation rate of 94.3% which is higher than the state of Tennessee's 89.6%. 

There are 44 schools in the district: one K-5 Magnet School, 23 elementary, 8 middle, 7 high, an Alternative School, one Early Technical College at Tennessee College of Applied Technology, and one Middle College, which is located on the campus of Austin Peay State University, and a K-12 Virtual School. CMCSS also offers eight specialized, interest-driven college and career academies within our high schools. Three new schools are set to be built to alleviate pressure off of several Elementary, Middle, and High Schools. Kirkwood Middle School is the first to be built set to open for the 2022-23 School Year. Kirkwood High School is set to follow in 2023-24 and Kirkwood Elementary School should open for the 2024-25 School Year. It will be possible that do to the tremendous growth in Clarksville-Montgomery County, that more schools will need to be built in the near future as most schools have a capacity of over 100%

The school system employs about 2,500+ certified teachers. The School System employs 5,400+ employees total. 



List of schools

High schools
Clarksville
Kenwood
Kirkwood (Set to open in 2023)
Middle College at APSU
Montgomery Central
Northeast
Northwest
Rossview
West Creek

Middle schools
Greenwood Complex (Alternative School)
Kenwood
Kirkwood 
Montgomery Central
New Providence
Northeast
Richview
Rossview 
West 

Elementary schools
Barkers Mill
Barksdale
Burt
Byrns Darden
Carmel
Cumberland Heights
East Montgomery
Glenellen
Hazelwood
Kenwood
Kirkwood (Set to open in 2024)
Liberty
Minglewood
Montgomery Central
Moore Magnet
Norman Smith
Northeast
Oakland
Pisgah
Ringgold
Rossview
St. Bethlehem
Sango
West Creek
Woodlawn

Notable alumni
Alex Poythress, Northeast, basketball player

References

External links
 Clarksville Montgomery County School System official website

School districts in Tennessee
Education in Montgomery County, Tennessee
Education in Clarksville, Tennessee

2. https://www.cmcss.net/